The Craig Oval is a cricket ground in Wembley Downs, a suburb of Perth, Western Australia. It is owned by, and part of, Hale School. It hosted the first Women's Test match between Australia and India.

References 

Cricket grounds in Australia
Hale School